Suguna Holdings Private Limited  is an Indian multinational poultry group headquartered in Coimbatore, India. The company was started in 2008 and its involved in broiler farming, vaccines, healthcare products, feeds and educational institute for poultry. It markets and exports broiler chicken, vaccines for poultry, and healthcare products for animals. It is the largest poultry group in India.

References

Poultry organizations
Companies based in Coimbatore
Poultry industry in India
2008 establishments in Tamil Nadu
Food and drink companies established in 2008
Indian companies established in 2008